Gordon Alexander Caygill (born 24 April 1940) is an English professional golfer. He had considerable early success as a young professional from 1960 to 1963 but then had a lean period, partly due to a stomach ulcer. He made a comeback in 1969, winning two tournaments, and gained a place in the 1969 Ryder Cup team.

Professional career
Caygill turned professional at an early age, becoming an assistant professional at West Bowling Golf Club near Bradford. He was briefly an assistant at Sunningdale, during which time he won the 1960 British Youths Open Championship at Pannal Golf Club by 7 strokes. He became an assistant at Pannal in 1961 and was chosen that year by Henry Cotton as his Rookie of the Year. In 1962 he won the British Youths Open Championship, which was again played at Pannal, for a second time, winning this time by 12 strokes. He had more success in 1963, winning the Coombe Hill Assistants' Tournament and the Rediffusion Tournament in the same week. In the 1964 Swallow-Penfold Tournament Caygill led Peter Alliss by 3 strokes with 5 holes to play but finished badly to drop into a tie for second place.

After his early successes he did not win again on the circuit until 1969 having suffered with stomach ulcers. That year he won twice, first at the Penfold Tournament, and then again at the Martini International, where he tied with South African Graham Henning. On the back of those wins Caygill was chosen as a member of the Great Britain and Ireland Ryder Cup team in 1969, although he only played one match, partnering Brian Huggett in Friday's foursomes. They halved their match against the American pair of Raymond Floyd and Miller Barber.

In 1970 Caygill had his only foreign win, the Lusaka Dunlop Open on the Safari Circuit, finishing two strokes of Craig Defoy. He played a limited number of events during the early years of the European Tour, from 1972 to 1977. His best finish was to reach the semi-final of the 1975 Piccadilly Medal.

In 1981 Caygill was fined £500 and suspended by the PGA following an incident the previous October at the Wansbeck Classic, a pro-am event.

Professional wins (12)

Major British PGA circuit wins (3)

Safari Circuit wins (1)

Other wins (8)
This list may be incomplete
1960 British Youths Open Championship
1962 British Youths Open Championship
1963 Coombe Hill Assistants' Tournament, Northern Professional Championship
1966 Gleneagles Hotel Foursomes Tournament (with Bernard Cawthray)
1973 Lancashire Open
1974 Northern Professional Championship
1978 Sunningdale Foursomes (with Julia Greenhalgh)

Results in major championships

Note: Caygill only played in The Open Championship.

CUT = missed the half-way cut
"T" indicates a tie for a place

Team appearances
Ryder Cup (representing Great Britain and Ireland): 1969 (tie)
Diamondhead Cup (representing Great Britain and Ireland): 1974

References

External links

English male golfers
European Tour golfers
Ryder Cup competitors for Europe
1940 births
Living people